Thayer is an unincorporated community in Lincoln Township, Newton County, in the U.S. state of Indiana.

History
Thayer was laid out as a town in 1882. The community was named for a first settler. A post office has been in operation at Thayer since 1881.

Thayer, along with Shelby, Sumava Resorts and other small Kankakee River communities, has historically had to contend with periodic flooding from the river.

References 

Unincorporated communities in Newton County, Indiana
Unincorporated communities in Indiana